Nathan Christián Dzaba (born 25 August 1995) is a Slovak 
footballer who plays as a attacker for Český Brod.

Career

Club career

In 2013, Dzaba participated in Czech reality television show SuperStar. As a youth player, Dzaba joined the youth academy of Czech top flight side Teplice. In 2016, he signed for ACD Jesolo in the talian eighth division. In 2017, he signed for Italian sixth division club Pravisdomini. After that, Dzaba signed for Melistar in the Spanish fourth division. 

In 2018, he signed for Czech second division team Varnsdorf, where he suffered an injury and made 10 league appearances and scored 0 goals. On 20 July 2018, Dzaba debuted for Varnsdorf during a 1-1 draw with Znojmo. Before the second half of 2018-19, he signed for Jílové in the Czech sixth division. Before the second half of 2019-20, he signed for Czech fourth division outfit Český Brod. In 2020, Dzaba almost signed for Coton Sport in the Cameroonian top flight.

International career

He is eligible to represent Congo internationally through his father.

References

External links

 

Living people
Association football forwards
Expatriate footballers in Italy
Expatriate footballers in the Czech Republic
1995 births
Slovak footballers
Expatriate footballers in Spain
FK Varnsdorf players
Slovak people of Republic of the Congo descent